Frithland is a large Colonial Revival-style house built in 1919 near Bunkie, Louisiana in Avoyelles Parish, Louisiana.  It was listed on the National Register of Historic Places in 1985.

The house was built for the Frith family, among the earliest settlers in the area of Bunkie;  it is the third Frith home on the Frithland Plantation.

It is a two-and-a-half story, frame house with "a monumental gallery featuring colossal, fluted, composite order columns and end pilasters" across nearly the entire front of the house.  It has a nearly full entablature, a balustrade, and a hipped roof with three front-facing dormer windows.  Over the main entrance is a small balcony with French doors.  The original building central hall plan with a rear ell.

A second contributing building is included in the listing.

It is located along Bayou Huffpower on Louisiana Highway 29, about 1.1 miles (1.8 km) south of Bunkie.

References

		
National Register of Historic Places in Avoyelles Parish, Louisiana
Buildings and structures completed in 1919
Colonial Revival architecture in Louisiana
Plantations in Louisiana